The PZL.45 Sokół (falcon) was a Polish prototype fighter designed by PZL from 1936–1939. Work commenced on the aircraft in the late 1936 based on earlier light fighters.

Design and development
Work on the aircraft was temporarily stopped but later resumed in 1938. The design was finished in 1938, and the first model was made in February 1939 with technical documentation completed in June of that year. A second prototype was designed to have retractable landing gear. It was a single-seat all-metal fighter aircraft and had a closed cockpit. The aircraft was also designed to be equipped with 4 machine guns (2 wing-mounted and 2 in the hull), though the prototype was not armed.

Specifications

References

1930s Polish fighter aircraft
PZL aircraft
Polish Air Force